The 2018 ICC Cricket World Cup Qualifier was a cricket tournament that took place during March 2018 in Zimbabwe. It formed the final part of the Cricket World Cup qualification process for the 2019 World Cup in England and Wales. The top two teams, Afghanistan and the West Indies, qualified for the World Cup, joining the hosts and the seven teams who had already qualified through their ranking in the ICC ODI Championship. Afghanistan won the tournament, beating the West Indies by 7 wickets in the final. Afghanistan's Mohammad Shahzad was named the player of the match and Zimbabwe's Sikandar Raza was named the player of the tournament.

The tournament was initially scheduled to take place in Bangladesh, but in May 2017 it was reported that the event would instead be hosted elsewhere as Bangladesh were close to automatic qualification, and thus would not need to participate in this tournament. Three bids were under consideration: one from Zimbabwe, one from the United Arab Emirates and a joint-bid from Ireland and Scotland, who were the winners of the previous qualifier tournament.

In October 2017, the International Cricket Council (ICC) announced that Zimbabwe would host the event. In January 2018, the ICC confirmed all the fixtures and venues for the tournament. At the end of the tournament, the Netherlands (who won the ICC World Cricket League Championship) and the top three Associate Member teams earned One Day International (ODI) status until 2023.

Summary
Hosts Zimbabwe failed to reach the final and missed out on playing in the Cricket World Cup for the first time since 1983. As a result of their poor performance, Zimbabwe Cricket sacked all their coaching staff and their team captain, Graeme Cremer. Recently appointed Full Member side Ireland also missed the Cricket World Cup for the first time since 2007, and for the first time, no Associate Member qualified for the Cricket World Cup.

Following the conclusion of the group stage, Afghanistan, Ireland, Scotland, United Arab Emirates, West Indies and Zimbabwe had all progressed to the Super Sixes, with a chance to qualify for the 2019 Cricket World Cup. Hong Kong, Nepal, Netherlands and Papua New Guinea did not qualify for the Super Sixes, but advanced to the playoffs to determine their final rankings in positions seven to ten. Both Scotland and the United Arab Emirates kept their ODI status until 2022, after reaching the Super Sixes.

Hong Kong, Nepal and Papua New Guinea competed for the final ODI status spot in the playoffs. In the first round of playoff matches, Nepal beat Papua New Guinea by 6 wickets and the Netherlands beat Hong Kong by 44 runs. Therefore, with the Netherlands already guaranteed ODI status at the end of the tournament, Nepal gained ODI status for the first time. With their defeats in the first playoff matches, Hong Kong and Papua New Guinea both lost their ODI status and were relegated to Division Two of the World Cricket League. The fixture between Hong Kong and Papua New Guinea, for the ninth place playoff, was the 4,000th ODI match to be played.

The West Indies became the first side to qualify for the 2019 Cricket World Cup, after they beat Scotland by five runs by the Duckworth–Lewis–Stern method in the Super Sixes. Tournament hosts Zimbabwe lost their final match in the Super Sixes to the United Arab Emirates, meaning they would need Afghanistan and Ireland's match to end as tie to allow them to progress to the Cricket World Cup. However, Afghanistan beat Ireland by five wickets in the final Super Six match, therefore joining the West Indies in the tournament final and also qualifying for the Cricket World Cup.

In the final, Afghanistan's Rashid Khan became the fastest and youngest bowler to take 100 wickets in ODIs when he dismissed Shai Hope. He took 44 matches to take his 100th dismissal, breaking the previous record of 52 matches, set by Mitchell Starc of Australia.

Teams
It was decided before the 2015 Cricket World Cup that the number of participating teams at the 2019 Cricket World Cup would be reduced to ten. A new World Cup qualification structure was introduced in which the host nation of the World Cup and the top seven other teams in the ICC ODI Championship on 30 September 2017 would qualify directly for the World Cup, with the remaining two spots being decided by the World Cup qualifying tournament. Following recent success, Afghanistan and Ireland were promoted into the ICC ODI Championship in 2015 taking the number of teams in the ICC ODI Championship to twelve. Afghanistan and Ireland were granted Test status in 2017 making them the 11th and 12th Test-playing nations, meaning that at least two Test-playing nations would miss the World Cup for the first time.

The bottom four teams in the ICC ODI Championship ranking will be joined by the top four teams from the 2015–17 ICC World Cricket League Championship and the two finalists of the 2018 ICC World Cricket League Division Two for the qualifying tournament. Therefore, at most two associate teams could qualify for the World Cup, or none if beaten by the Test playing nations.

ICC ODI Championship
The bottom four teams (9th to 12th places) in the ICC ODI Championship, as at 30 September 2017, did not receive automatic World Cup qualification and are required to play in the 2018 World Cup Qualifier. Qualification by this route was finalised after the West Indies lost the first match of their ODI series against England in September 2017, meaning they were unable to catch any of the teams above them in the rankings by the cut-off date. Afghanistan, Ireland and Zimbabwe, below the West Indies in the rankings, were confirmed as having to play in the qualification tournament before this date.

WCL Championship
The top four teams from the 2015–17 ICC World Cricket League Championship qualified for the 2018 World Cup Qualifier. After the conclusion of the sixth round of fixtures in the championship, both the Netherlands and Papua New Guinea had qualified. Following the first fixtures in round seven, they were joined by Scotland and Hong Kong. The Netherlands ended up winning the tournament, with Scotland finishing second followed by Hong Kong in third and Papua New Guinea fourth.

WCL Division Two
The top two teams from the 2018 ICC World Cricket League Division Two qualified for the 2018 World Cup Qualifier. Nepal and the United Arab Emirates placed first and second in the round-robin stage, thus claiming the final places in the Qualifier. The United Arab Emirates won the final of the Division Two tournament to go into Group A, with Nepal placed in Group B.

Tournament format
Initially, the teams were split into two groups of five; these groups played on a round-robin basis. Two points were awarded for a win, one point for a no result and no points for a loss. The top three teams in each group went forward to a Super Six round. The results between the progressing teams were carried forward, including the corresponding points and net run rate, while the results against the teams that finished in the bottom two places in each group were discarded. Each team then played the qualifiers from the other group. The remaining four teams (that finish in the bottom two places in each group)  played-off for positions 7–10. The bottom two Associate Member teams, excluding the Netherlands, were relegated to the ICC World Cricket League Division Two.

The top two teams at the end of the Super Six stage earned qualification to the 2019 World Cup, and also contested the final to determine the winner of the tournament. If the final ended as a tie, then a Super Over would have been played to decide the winner. In the event of a no result, the tournament's winner would have been the side that finished highest in the Super Sixes.

Squads
The following squads were named ahead of the tournament:

Prior to the tournament, Stephan Myburgh was ruled out of the Netherlands squad due to injury and was replaced by Bas de Leede. Zimbabwe initially named Ryan Burl and Tarisai Musakanda in their squad, but they were replaced by Sean Williams and Cephas Zhuwao.

Afghanistan's captain Asghar Stanikzai missed the start of the tournament, after having his appendix removed. Rashid Khan captained Afghanistan in Stanikzai's absence. Stanikzai was eventually ruled out of the start of the tournament and was replaced by Afsar Zazai. Stanikzai returned to the squad, after he was declared fit to play, ahead of Afghanistan's final two Super Six matches. Stanikzai's replacement, Afsar Zazai, was ruled out of the last two matches due to injury. Following Afghanistan's match with Zimbabwe, Mohammad Shahzad was suspended for the final two group matches after being found guilty of damaging part of the ground.

Zimbabwe's Brian Vitori was suspended from bowling, following the match with Nepal. He was replaced by Richard Ngarava. Sheldon Cottrell was replaced in the West Indies squad by Keemo Paul, after Cottrell injured himself during the match against the United Arab Emirates. Ahead of Hong Kong's group match with Scotland, Ahsan Abbasi suffered an injury and was ruled out of the tournament. He was replaced by Kinchit Shah.

Warm-up matches

Ten non-ODI warm-up matches were played on 27 February and 1 March.

Group stage
The ICC confirmed the fixtures for the tournament in January 2018. All the matches were recorded as ODIs, except those that involved the Netherlands and Nepal, as they did not have ODI status at the start of the tournament. On 8 March 2018, the venues for the final two games in Group B were switched, due to the anticipated attendance for Zimbabwe's last group match. On 13 March 2018, the ICC confirmed all the umpires for the Super Sixes and playoff matches.

Group A

Points table

Fixtures

Group B

Points table

Fixtures

Playoffs

Super Sixes

Final

Final standings
These were the final standings at the end of the tournament:

References

External links
 Series home at ESPN Cricinfo

Qualifier
World Cup Qualifier
World Cup Qualifier
World Cup Qualifier, 2018
2018
Cricket World Cup Qualifier